Action Man  is an action figure toy.

Action Man may also refer to:

Connected to the toy
 Action Man (1993–2006 toyline), the second-generation Hasbro Action Man
 Action Man: 40th Anniversary, a 2006 series of reproduction figures
 Action Man (1995 TV series), an American children's animated television show
 Action Man (2000 TV series), a Canadian CGI animated TV series
 Action Man (comics), a UK comic series
 Action Man: Robot Atak, a 2004 direct-to-DVD CGI animated film
 Action Man: Search for Base X, a 2001 action video game
 Action Man: Destruction X, a 2000 action video game
 Action Man: Jungle Storm, a 2000 action video game
 Action Man: Raid on Island X, a 1999 action video game
 Action Man: Operation Extreme, a 1999 action video game
 Action Man A.T.O.M., a French-American animated television series

Not connected to the toy
 Action Man (film), a 1967  French film
 Dick Beyer (1930–2019), wrestler
 "Action Man", a song by Widespread Panic from the album Don't Tell the Band
 "Action Man", a song by Cephas & Wiggins from the album Cool Down
 The Action Man, a Venture Bros. character

See also
 Man of Action (disambiguation)